The Annual Review of Nuclear and Particle Science is a peer-reviewed academic journal that publishes review articles about nuclear and particle science. As of 2022, Journal Citation Reports lists the journal's 2021 impact factor as  17.727, ranking it first of 19 journal titles in the category "Physics, Nuclear" and second of 29 journal titles in the category "Physics, Particles and Fields".

The journal was first created by the National Research Council's Committee on Nuclear Science, which partnered with Annual Reviews to produce the first volume in 1952. The initial title of the journal was Annual Review of Nuclear Science. Annual Reviews published all volumes independently beginning with Volume 3. In 1978, the journal's name was changed to Annual Review of Nuclear and Particle Science. 
In its history, it has had six editors, four of whom had tenures of 10 or more years: Emilio Segrè, John David Jackson, Chris Quigg, and Barry R. Holstein.

History
In the early 1950s, the National Research Council's Committee on Nuclear Science announced its support for an annual volume of review articles that covered recent developments in the field of nuclear science. One of the key proponents of creating the journal was Alberto F. Thompson, who had previously helped establish Nuclear Science Abstracts in 1948. The Committee on Nuclear Science consulted the nonprofit publishing company Annual Reviews for advice, and Annual Reviews agreed to publish the initial and subsequent volumes. Members of the Committee acted as the editorial board for the first volume, which was published in December 1952. Published under the title Annual Review of Nuclear Science, it covered nuclear science developments in 1950. Beginning with Volume 2, James G. Beckerley was editor, with Martin D. Kamen, Donald F. Mastick, and Leonard I. Schiff as associate editors. From Volume 3 onward, Annual Reviews assumed all responsibility for the journal from the National Research Council. 

In 1978, the journal's name was changed to the Annual Review of Nuclear and Particle Science. This name was judged to be more reflective of the journal's content, which also included particle physics. Under Annual Reviews's Subscribe to Open publishing model, it was announced that the 2020 volume of Annual Review of Nuclear and Particle Science would be published open access, a first for the journal. As of 2020, it was published both in print and electronically.

Editorial processes
The Annual Review of Nuclear and Particle Science is helmed by the editor. The editor is assisted by the editorial committee, which includes associate editors, regular members, and occasionally guest editors. Guest members participate at the invitation of the editor, and serve terms of one year. All other members of the editorial committee are appointed by the Annual Reviews board of directors and serve five-year terms. The editorial committee determines which topics should be included in each volume and solicits reviews from qualified authors. Unsolicited manuscripts are not accepted. Peer review of accepted manuscripts is undertaken by the editorial committee.

Editors of volumes
Dates indicate publication years in which someone was credited as a lead editor or co-editor of a journal volume. The planning process for a volume begins well before the volume appears, so appointment to the position of lead editor generally occurred prior to the first year shown here. An editor who has retired or died may be credited as a lead editor of a volume that they helped to plan, even if it is published after their retirement or death. 

James G. Beckerley 1953–1957
Emilio Segrè 1958–1977
John David Jackson 1978–1993
Chris Quigg 1994–2004
Boris Kayser  Appointed 2004, credited 2005–2010
Barry R. Holstein Appointed 2009, credited 2011–present

References

 

Nuclear and Particle Science
Nuclear physics journals
Annual journals
Publications established in 1952
English-language journals
Physics review journals